Robert Brennan (born 1941) is a New Zealand priest of the Missionary Society of St. Columban in South Korea. He is a social activist.

Early life
He spent his childhood in Auckland and was educated at St Peter's College, Auckland. He trained as a priest in Australia and was ordained a priest on 3 July 1965.

South Korea
Brennan was sent to South Korea in 1966 and spent 12 years in the poor coal mining mountainous area of Kang Won Province; In 1980 he moved to Seoul where he has been involved in housing rights, fighting for the people being dispossessed of their homes in the name of re-development; On 4 September 2012 he was awarded the City of Seoul's Grand Prize for Social Welfare in recognition of his 32-year fight for and on behalf of evictees in the city of Seoul; The Mayor of Seoul,  Park Won-soon made the award at a public ceremony; In his address of congratulation the Mayor said: "The blue-eyed foreigner is a model of selfless dedication and sacrifice on behalf of the poorest members of our city"; Since 2004 Brennan has also run the Samyang Resident Solidarity which works for those looking for jobs and also provides small loans. In 2012 Brennan was granted honorary citizenship of the city of Seoul in recognition of his community services including financial services, job counseling, and housing for the homeless and evictees. He was quoted as saying: "I, myself, have been evicted from my house three times and I will go anywhere if someone without a home needs my help." In identifying with his Korean mission, Brennan adopted the Korean name Ahn Gwang-hoon.

See also

Sources

1941 births
Living people
New Zealand people of Irish descent
New Zealand Roman Catholic priests
People from the Auckland Region
New Zealand Roman Catholic missionaries
People educated at St Peter's College, Auckland
Roman Catholic missionaries in South Korea
South Korean Roman Catholic priests
Missionary Society of St. Columban
New Zealand emigrants to South Korea
South Korean people of Irish descent